Under the Kudzu is the fifth studio album by American country music group Shenandoah. Released in 1993, it produced their fifth and last number one hit to date with "If Bubba Can Dance (I Can Too)" co-written by band members Marty Raybon, Mike McGuire and Bob McDill. Other singles included "Janie Baker's Love Slave", "I Want to Be Loved Like That", and "I'll Go Down Loving You". They charted at #15, #3 and #46, respectively. It is also the second and final album for the RCA Nashville label.

Track listing

AOmitted from cassette version.

Release history

Personnel
Shenandoah
 Marty Raybon - lead vocals, acoustic guitar
 Jim Seales - electric guitar, background vocals
 Stan Thorn - piano, keyboards, background vocals
 Ralph Ezell - bass guitar, background vocals
 Mike McGuire - drums, background vocals

Other musicians
 Bruce Bouton - steel guitar
 Dennis J. Burnside - piano
 Mark Casstevens - acoustic guitar
 Rob Hajacos - fiddle
 Brent Mason - electric guitar
 John Wesley Ryles - background vocals
 Tommy White - steel guitar
 Dennis Wilson - background vocals
 Lonnie Wilson - drums, percussion

Production
Don Cook: Producer
Mike Bradley: Engineer, Mixing
Mark Capps: Production Assistant, Assistant Engineer, Assistant Mixing
Hank Williams: Mastering

Chart performance

1993 albums
RCA Records albums
Shenandoah (band) albums
Albums produced by Don Cook